The Maya Research Program (MRP) is a US-based non-profit organization (501C3), incorporated in January 1993, which sponsors archaeological and ethnographic research in Middle America. Every summer, the organisation sponsors archaeological fieldwork at the ancient Maya site of Blue Creek in northwestern Belize.

The MRP has received support from the National Geographic Society, the National Science Foundation, the Foundation for the Advancement of Mesoamerican Studies, the Heinz Foundation, and the American Council of Learned Societies.

References

External links
 Maya Research Program

Charities based in Texas
Ethnography
Archaeological organizations
Archaeology of Belize
Archaeology of the Americas